On the Road is a self-published coffee table book written by the NASCAR driver Jimmie Johnson and his wife Chandra, with photographs taken by Missy McLamb. It was released in September 2012.

Summary
On the Road covers a behind-the-scenes look at NASCAR driver Jimmie Johnson and his family during the 2011 Chase for the Sprint Cup, in which he attempted to win his sixth Sprint Cup Series title, having won the championship during five consecutive seasons between 2006 and 2010. Johnson ultimately finished sixth in the final point standings, his worst points finish since joining the Cup Series full-time in 2002.

References

External links

 Jimmie Johnson official website
 Missy McLamb official website

2012 non-fiction books
American autobiographies
Coffee table books
Jimmie Johnson
NASCAR mass media
Self-published books
Sports autobiographies